Alan Charles Wilder (born 1 June 1959) is an English musician, composer, arranger, record producer and former member of the electronic band Depeche Mode from 1982 to 1995. Since his departure from the band, the musical project called Recoil became his primary musical enterprise, which initially started as a side project to Depeche Mode in 1986. Wilder has also provided production and remixing services to the bands Nitzer Ebb and Curve. Alan Wilder was inducted into the Rock and Roll Hall of Fame in 2020 as a member of Depeche Mode.
He is a classically trained musician.

Early years
Alan Charles Wilder was born the youngest boy born into a middle class family of 3 boys and was raised in Acton, West London. He began piano at the age of eight, through the encouragement of his parents. Later on, he learned the flute at St Clement Danes grammar school and became a leading musician in his school bands. After school, Alan worked as a studio assistant at DJM Studios. This led to him ending up working for bands such as The Dragons and Dafne & the Tenderspots (as Alan Normal). Others include Real to Real (featuring Adrian Chilvers on bass, Pete Fresh on guitar, Wolfgang Marlander on drums and Paul St. James on vocals), the Hitmen, and the Korgis, appearing on the UK No. 13 single "If I Had You" (1979).

1982–1995: Depeche Mode

Following the departure of Vince Clarke, Depeche Mode placed an advertisement in the music magazine Melody Maker: "Keyboard player needed for established band – no timewasters." Even though the ad was looking for someone under 21 (Wilder was 22) he lied about his age to get the job, and got away with it. He joined Depeche Mode in January 1982, initially as a tour keyboardist, and soon thereafter as a full member of the recording band. His first studio contribution was on the single "Get the Balance Right!" in December 1982, released the following month.

Wilder wrote a handful of songs for Depeche Mode, including "Two Minute Warning" and "The Landscape Is Changing" (and a B-side, "Fools") from the album Construction Time Again, and "If You Want" (and a B-side, "In Your Memory") from the album Some Great Reward and finally co-wrote "Black Day" (and a B-side, "Christmas Island") from the album Black Celebration.
However, Wilder's more notable contributions to Depeche Mode were as a musician, arranger, and producer.

In addition to playing synthesizer throughout his time with Depeche Mode, Wilder also played piano on the band's signature ballad "Somebody". In the documentary film 101, Wilder demonstrates how different synthesizer parts of a song are split and arranged across a sampling keyboard for playing them live during the concert, just one small example of Wilder's ongoing contributions to Depeche Mode during his time as a member of the group. For the recording of the album Songs of Faith and Devotion and its corresponding Devotional Tour, Wilder also played live drums.

For "Enjoy the Silence" from the album Violator, Wilder took Martin Gore's melancholy ballad-esque demo and re-envisioned the song as a percolating, melodic dance track. The resulting single went on to become one of the most commercially successful songs in Depeche Mode's history.

Departure
On 26 June 1995, Wilder announced his departure from Depeche Mode:

"Due to increasing dissatisfaction with the internal relations and working practices of the group, it is with some sadness that I have decided to part company from Depeche Mode. My decision to leave the group was not an easy one particularly as our last few albums were an indication of the full potential that Depeche Mode was realizing. Since joining in 1982, I have continually striven to give total energy, enthusiasm and commitment to the furthering of the group's success and in spite of a consistent imbalance in the distribution of the workload, willingly offered this. Unfortunately, within the group, this level of input never received the respect and acknowledgement that it warrants. Whilst I believe that the calibre of our musical output has improved, the quality of our association has deteriorated to the point where I no longer feel that the end justifies the means. I have no wish to cast aspersions on any individual; suffice to say that relations have become seriously strained, increasingly frustrating and, ultimately, in certain situations, intolerable. Given these circumstances, I have no option but to leave the group. It seems preferable therefore, to leave on a relative high, and as I still retain a great enthusiasm and passion for music, I am excited by the prospect of pursuing new projects. The remaining band members have my support and best wishes for anything they may pursue in the future, be it collectively or individually."

After his split from Depeche Mode, Wilder was approached by Robert Smith with an offer to join the Cure. Wilder respectfully declined.
According to Wilder himself, the possibility was offered on behalf of the Cure by Daryl Bamonte (tour manager for both Depeche Mode and the Cure, and brother of the Cure member Perry Bamonte), and he declined as joining another band was the last thing on his mind.

He briefly reunited with Depeche Mode during the Teenage Cancer Trust concert at the Royal Albert Hall in London on 17 February 2010. During the encore, Wilder accompanied Martin Gore on piano for "Somebody". Gore returned the favour and played a DJ set on one of Recoil's Selected Events.

In 2011, Wilder provided two mixes for the Depeche Mode track "In Chains".

1986–present: Recoil

Side project
Recoil began in 1986 as a two-track experimental EP. Simply entitled 1 + 2, this collection of primitive demos caught the attention of Mute Records label boss Daniel Miller and was inconspicuously released as a mini-album on 12" vinyl. An album, Hydrology, soon followed in 1988 and both were eventually re-issued by Mute on CD as Hydrology plus 1 + 2. Wilder described the project at the time as "an antidote to Depeche Mode; a way to alleviate the frustrations of always working within a pop format".

Almost immediately, Wilder found himself back in the studio to record what would become the most successful Depeche Mode album to date, Violator. It wasn't until the band finally allowed themselves an extended break after the World Violation Tour that Alan could return to Recoil—not, however, before agreeing to produce Ebbhead, another album for label-mates Nitzer Ebb.

It was during this time that he cemented a working relationship with lead singer Douglas McCarthy (Nitzer Ebb/ Fixmer McCarthy) who would return the favour by singing on Recoil's next album, Bloodline. For the Bloodline LP, released in 1991, Wilder recruited guest vocalists for the first time, with further contributions from Toni Halliday and Moby. 'Bloodline' also marked the first Recoil single, a cover of Alex Harvey's song 'Faith Healer' as well as 'Electro Blues For Bukka White', featuring the sampled voice of bluesman White set into a post-modern context.

Between 1992 and 1993 Wilder resumed his Depeche Mode duties as the band recorded the album Songs of Faith and Devotion, leaving the band in June 1995.

Solo work
Free from his group commitments, Wilder could now focus solely on Recoil. In September 1996, he began work in his own studio, The Thin Line, gradually piecing together what would become Recoil's next album Unsound Methods. Guest vocalists this time played a more up-front role than ever and featured Maggie Estep, Siobhan Lynch, the reappearance of Douglas McCarthy, and Hildia Campbell.

In the spring of 2000, Recoil released Liquid which this time featured fellow Mute artist Diamanda Galás, 1940s gospel crooners the Golden Gate Jubilee Quartet, along with New York spoken-word performers Nicole Blackman and Samantha Coerbell.

Following a five-year break from recording, Alan Wilder returned in 2007 with Recoil's fifth studio album, entitled SubHuman.

2010 saw the release of Selected, a selection of Recoil tracks chosen by Wilder, who said: "The collection is made up of my personal favourites, remastered and edited together into what I consider a cohesive and total listening experience."

A tour entitled A Strange Hour was presented during 2010 and 2011 in 52 cities across the world, as part of the Selected Events, which celebrated 25 years of the Recoil project. It signified the first time Recoil had ever taken to the road.  The events were not so much live band but more art or video installation. Wilder gathered together filmmakers from as far as Russia, via the Czechia and Hungary, all the way to Argentina for this purpose, creating a central server where everybody could upload their work for others to see, react to and feedback on.

Recoil returned in 2012 to release the concert film A Strange Hour In Budapest on Blu-ray, with 5.1 surround sound, directed by Attila Herkó.

Also in 2012, Alan Wilder was the executive producer and contributor for Spirit Of Talk Talk, a tribute album to Mark Hollis and Talk Talk. Recoil offered two cover versions for the album featuring the vocals of Linton Kwesi Johnson, Shara Worden and Paul Marshall. Wilder also mixed a track for Richard Reed Parry from Arcade Fire. The album was released in September 2012 on Fierce Panda Records.

Discography

Early work
 The Dragons – "Misbehavin'" (1977)
 Dafne & the Tenderspots – "Disco Hell" (1979)
 The Korgis – "If I Had You" (1979) - UK No. 13 (the track also appears on The Korgis, as well as all of the band's compilation albums)
 Real to Real – "White Man Reggae" (March 1980)
 Real to Real – "The Blue" (1980)
 Real to Real – Tightrope Walkers (November 1980)
 Real to Real – "Mr. and Mrs." (March 1981)
 The Flatbackers – "Serenade of Love" (1981)
 The Hitmen – "Ouija" (1981)

With Depeche Mode

Wilder appeared on all of Depeche Mode's releases from "Get the Balance Right" (31 January 1983) up to "In Your Room" (10 January 1994), later taking part in reissues and compilations containing material from his time in the band.

Discography featuring Alan Wilder
Studio albums
 Construction Time Again (1983)
 Some Great Reward (1984)
 Black Celebration (1986)
 Music for the Masses (1987)
 Violator (1990)
 Songs of Faith and Devotion (1993)

Live albums
 101 (1989)
 Songs of Faith and Devotion Live (1993)

Compilations
 People Are People (1984) - all tracks, excepting: "Now This Is Fun" and "Leave In Silence".
 The Singles 81→85 (1985) - all tracks, excepting: "Dreaming of Me", "New Life", "Just Can't Get Enough", "See You", "The Meaning of Love" (only on the CD version) and "Leave in Silence"; also, he did not feature on both the bonus tracks on the 1998 reissue.
 Catching Up with Depeche Mode (1985) - all tracks, excepting: "Dreaming of Me", "New Life", "Just Can't Get Enough", "See You" and "The Meaning of Love".
 The Singles 86–98 (1998) - all tracks, excepting: "Barrel of a Gun", "It's No Good", "Home", "Useless" and "Only When I Lose Myself
 Remixes 81–04 (2004) - all tracks, excepting "Barrel of a Gun" (Underworld Hard Mix) (one-disc edition), "Useless" (The Kruder + Dorfmeister Session™), "Home" (Air 'Around the Golf' Remix), "Just Can't Get Enough" (Schizo Mix) and "Enjoy the Silence 04"; all tracks, excepting: "Shout!" (Rio Remix), "Home" (Air 'Around the Golf' Remix), "Barrel of a Gun" (Underworld Hard Mix), "Freelove" (DJ Muggs Remix), "I Feel Loved" (Chamber's Remix), "Just Can't Get Enough" (Schizo Mix) (two-disc edition), "Painkiller" (Kill the Pain DJ Shadow vs. Depeche Mode), "Useless" (The Kruder + Dorfmeister Session™), "Dream On" (Dave Clarke Acoustic Version), "It's No Good" (Speedy J Mix) and "Enjoy the Silence" (Timo Maas Extended Mix); all tracks, excepting all the above and "I Feel Loved" (Danny Tenaglia's Labor of Love Dub (Edit)), "It's No Good" (Club 69 Future Mix), "Photographic" (Rex the Dog Dubb Mix).
 The Best of Depeche Mode Volume 1 (2006) - all tracks, excepting: "Just Can't Get Enough", "See You", "It's No Good", "Suffer Well", "Dream On", "Martyr", "Precious" and "New Life".
 Remixes 2: 81–11 (2011) - partial.

Singles
 "Get the Balance Right!"
 "Everything Counts"
 "Love, in Itself"
 "People Are People"
 "Master and Servant"
 "Blasphemous Rumours" / "Somebody"
 "Shake the Disease"
 "It's Called a Heart"
 "Stripped"
 "A Question of Lust"
 "A Question of Time"
 "Strangelove"
 "Never Let Me Down Again"
 "Behind the Wheel"
 "Little 15"
 "Personal Jesus"
 "Enjoy the Silence"
 "Policy of Truth"
 "World in My Eyes"
 "I Feel You"
 "Walking in My Shoes"
 "Condemnation"
 "In Your Room"

Video albums
 The World We Live In and Live in Hamburg (1985)
 Some Great Videos (1985) - all clips, except "Just Can't Get Enough"
 Strange (1988)
 101 (1989)
 Strange Too (1990)
 Devotional (1993)
 The Videos 86–98 (1998) - all clips, except: "Barrel of a Gun", "It's No Good", "Home", "Useless", "Only When I Lose Myself" and "Ultra - Electronic Press Kit".
 The Best of Depeche Mode Volume 1 (2006) - all clips, except: "Just Can't Get Enough", "Barrel of a Gun", "It's No Good", "Home", "Only When I Lose Myself", "Dream On", "I Feel Loved", "Enjoy the Silence 04", "Precious" and "Suffer Well".
 Video Singles Collection (2016) - all clips, except: "Just Can't Get Enough" and 33-55 clips

Depeche Mode songs composed by Alan Wilder
 "The Great Outdoors!" (single "Get the Balance Right!", 1983 - co-written with Martin Gore)
 "Work Hard" (single "Everything Counts", 1983 - co-written with Martin Gore)
 "Two Minute Warning" (album Construction Time Again, 1983)
 "The Landscape Is Changing" (album Construction Time Again, 1983)
 "Fools" (single "Love, in Itself", 1983)
 "In Your Memory" (single "People Are People", 1984)
 "If You Want" (album Some Great Reward, 1984)
 "Black Day" (single "Stripped" and album Black Celebration, 1986 - co-written with Martin Gore and Daniel Miller)
 "Christmas Island" (single "A Question of Lust", 1986 - co-written with Martin Gore)

As Recoil

Collected
Wilder organized with Omega an auction selling a lot of DM collectable items on 3 September 2011 in Manchester. A DVD called Collected + was released as promotion for these events.

Covers and collaborations
1991 – Mixed the Nitzer Ebb song "Come Alive" from the As Is EP.
1991 – Along with Flood, produced the Nitzer Ebb album Ebbhead.
2001 – Provided strings and ambient sounds for the song "Polaroid" from the Curve album Gift.
2003 – Provided strings and sounds for The Digital Intervention track "Coma Idyllique" from the album Capture. 'PK', a longtime Recoil collaborator is one of its members along with Olivia Louvel.
2012 – Covered two tracks: "Inheritance" – Recoil (ft. Linton Kwesi Johnson & Paul Marshall) and "Dum Dum Girl" – Recoil (ft. Shara Worden) for a Talk Talk tribute album (double) CD/book set called Spirit of Talk Talk. He also became executive music producer for the album.
2016 – Provided music and arrangements for "Calling the Clock" by Dede (featuring Alan Wilder).

Remixes
1989: Toni Halliday – "Time Turns Around" (Euro-Tech Version)
1991: Nitzer Ebb – "I Give to You" (Wilder Mix Full Version)
2010: Nitzer Ebb – "I Am Undone" (Alan Wilder Remix)
2011: Depeche Mode – "In Chains" (Alan Wilder Remix)
2011: Sonoio – "Minutes" (Expansion Mix)

References

External links
 Shunt – The Official Recoil Website
 Recoil Official Store

1959 births
20th-century English musicians
21st-century English musicians
Depeche Mode members
English electronic musicians
English new wave musicians
English record producers
English rock drummers
English rock keyboardists
English songwriters
Living people
People from Acton, London
People from Hammersmith
Musicians from London
British synth-pop new wave musicians
Mute Records artists
Reprise Records artists
Warner Records artists
People educated at St. Clement Danes School